Xing Aowei (born February 15, 1982, in Yantai, Shandong) is a Male Chinese gymnast. Xing was part of the Chinese team that won the gold medal in the team event at the 2000 Summer Olympics in Sydney. He was also a part of the 2004 Olympic team in Athens, but placed fifth after his mistake on floor plus two falls (and another major mistake) from his teammate Teng Haibin.

Major performances
1998 Asian Games - 1st team & pommel horse, 3rd horizontal bar
1998 National Championships - 1st pommel horse
1998 World Middle School Students Games - 1st all-around, floor exercise, pommel horse, parallel bars & horizontal bar
1999 National Championships - 1st pommel horse, 2nd floor exercise
1999 World Cup Series - 1st pommel horse
1999 National Champions Tournament - 2nd pommel horse
1999 World Championships - 1st team, 3rd floor exercise
2000 National Championships - 1st all-around, floor exercise & pommel horse, 2nd parallel bars
2000 Sydney Olympic Games - 1st team
2000 World Cup Grand Finals - 3rd pommel horse
2001 East Asian Games - 1st team, vaulting horse & horizontal bar
2001 National Championships - 1st horizontal bar
2002 Asian Games - 1st team
2004 Athens Olympics - 5th team

References

 - China Daily

Medalists at the World Artistic Gymnastics Championships
1982 births
Living people
Chinese male artistic gymnasts
Gymnasts at the 2000 Summer Olympics
Gymnasts at the 2004 Summer Olympics
Olympic gold medalists for China
Olympic gymnasts of China
Sportspeople from Yantai
Olympic medalists in gymnastics
Gymnasts from Shandong
Asian Games medalists in gymnastics
Gymnasts at the 1998 Asian Games
Asian Games gold medalists for China
Asian Games bronze medalists for China
Medalists at the 1998 Asian Games
Medalists at the 2000 Summer Olympics
21st-century Chinese people